France-Guyane is a daily, French-language newspaper headquartered in Cayenne, French Guiana. Founded in 1973, the newspaper is owned by French-Antilles, which is controlled by the Groupe Hersant Média group.

External links
France-Guyane

Cayenne
Newspapers published in French Guiana
Mass media in French Guiana
Publications established in 1973